Kenny James (born April 14, 1984) is a former American football running back. He was signed by the Seattle Seahawks as an undrafted free agent in 2007. He played college football at Washington.

College career

James graduated in June 2006 with a degree in American ethnic studies.

NFL Combine

At the 2007 NFL Combine,  Kenny measured in at 5'9" and 217 pounds.  His 40 time was 4.62 seconds.

External links
Player Bio: Kenny James

1984 births
Living people
American football running backs
Seattle Seahawks players
Washington Huskies football players